Éder Gustavo Pagoto (born 10 May 1973) is a Brazilian equestrian. He competed in the team eventing at the 2000 Summer Olympics.

References

External links
 

1973 births
Living people
Brazilian male equestrians
Olympic equestrians of Brazil
Equestrians at the 2000 Summer Olympics
People from Pirassununga
Sportspeople from São Paulo (state)